Sajan  is an Indian film director who works in Malayalam and Tamil films. Since the early 1980s he has directed some 30 films. He has also done many television serials and telefilms. Sajan's real name is Siddeeq. He assessed by Crossbelt Mani, N. Sankaran Nair, J. Williams and Sasidharan Nair.

Filmography

Television serials
Krishna paksham(Dooradarsan)
Thapasya(Dooradarsan)
Desadanapakshi(Asianet)
Mouna mekhangal(Asianet)
Mizhiyoram(Asianet)
Chechiyamma
Sthreethwam(surya)
Sthree-Part3(Asianet)
Snehatheeram
Swantham lekhakan
Kanappurangal

Telefilms
Kaliwatch
Nirnnayam
Alapanam
Ganakokilam

See also
List of Malayalam films from 1976 to 1980
List of Malayalam films from 1981 to 1985
List of Malayalam films from 1986 to 1990
List of Malayalam films from 1991 to 1995
List of Malayalam films from 1996 to 2000

References

External links
 

Tamil film directors
Malayalam film directors
Living people
Indian television directors
Year of birth missing (living people)